Madsen & T. Baagøe, also known as Madsen & T. Baagøes Elektroplet- og Nysølvvarefabrik was a Danish silver plate and nickel silver factory in Copenhagen, Denmark. Products from the company are stamped with the letters M & TB.

History
The company was founded in 1874 It obtained several patents on improved electroplating techniques. The company was also active in the market for import of silver plate products.

Location
It company located in Tordenskjoldsgade in the Gammelholm area of central Copenhagen.

References

Manufacturing companies of Denmark
Danish companies established in 1874